Uren is an unincorporated community in Saskatchewan. It is located in the Rural Municipality of Chaplin No. 164.

Chaplin No. 164, Saskatchewan
Unincorporated communities in Saskatchewan
Division No. 7, Saskatchewan